Jacob Reynier Wortendyke (November 27, 1818 – November 7, 1868) was an American Democratic Party politician who represented  in the United States House of Representatives from 1857 to 1859.

Wortendyke was born in Chestnut Ridge, New Jersey (in present-day Montvale) on November 27, 1818. He completed preparatory studies under a private tutor, and graduated from Rutgers College in 1839. He taught school for ten years. He studied law, was admitted to the bar in 1853 and commenced practice in Jersey City, New Jersey.

Wortendyke was elected as a Democrat to the Thirty-fifth Congress, serving in office from March 4, 1857 to March 3, 1859, but was an unsuccessful candidate for reelection in 1858 to the Thirty-sixth Congress.

After leaving congress, he resumed the practice of law. He was a trustee of Rutgers College from 1862–1868, and was president of the Jersey City water board from 1860-1868. He was president of the Riparian Commission of New Jersey from 1865–1868, and was a delegate to the 1868 Democratic National Convention. He died in Jersey City on November 7, 1868, and was interred in the Dutch Reformed Church Cemetery in Park Ridge, New Jersey.

The Jacob Wortendyke House in Woodcliff Lake, New Jersey, has been listed on the National Register of Historic Places since 1983 (as Reference #: 83001593).

References

External links

Jacob Reynier Wortendyke at The Political Graveyard

1818 births
1868 deaths
Democratic Party members of the United States House of Representatives from New Jersey
New Jersey lawyers
People from Montvale, New Jersey
People from Woodcliff Lake, New Jersey
Rutgers University alumni
American people of Dutch descent
19th-century American politicians
19th-century American lawyers